Cortia is a genus of flowering plants belonging to the family Apiaceae.

Its native range is Himalaya to Tibet.

Species:

Cortia candollei 
Cortia depressa 
Cortia lhasana 
Cortia staintoniana

References

Apioideae
Apioideae genera